Maria Limardo (born 16 October 1960 in Cessaniti) is an Italian politician.

Formerly member of right-wing party National Alliance, she joined The People of Freedom in 2009. She served as assessor in the Elio Costa government in Vibo Valentia from 2002 to 2005.

Limardo ran for Mayor of Vibo Valentia at the 2019 local elections as an independent, supported by a centre-right coalition composed of Forza Italia, Brothers of Italy and local civic lists. She won and took office on 3 June 2019.

She is the first woman to be elected Mayor of Vibo Valentia.

See also
2019 Italian local elections
List of mayors of Vibo Valentia

References

External links
 
 

1960 births
Living people
Mayors of Vibo Valentia
National Alliance (Italy) politicians
The People of Freedom politicians